Florida West International Airways, Inc. (often abbreviated as FWIA) was an American cargo airline based at Miami, Florida. It operated scheduled and charter services worldwide, with its main markets in Latin America, the Caribbean and the United States. The airline later became a subsidiary of the Atlas Air Worldwide Holdings.

History
The airline was founded in 1981 as a repair station at Miami Airport named Pan Aero International. It changed its name in January 1984 to Florida West Airlines.

On February 28, 1994, Florida West acquired Tradewinds Airlines. After the airline filed for bankruptcy on October 11, 1994, it's assets were sold and it was rebranded as Florida West International Airways the following year restarting operations on March 12, 1996.

In December 2000, LAN Airlines purchased 25% stake of the airline.

On April 7, 2016, Atlas Air Worldwide Holdings, along with Southern Air, acquired Florida West International. On February 28, 2017, Atlas Air Worldwide Holdings shut down Florida West International, with the U.S. Department of Transportation cancelling their cargo carrier's certificates of authority on March 27.

Destinations

Fleet

Florida West International Airways operated the following aircraft:

See also
Atlas Air
List of defunct airlines of the United States

References

External links

Defunct airlines of the United States
Airlines established in 1984
Airlines disestablished in 2017
Companies that filed for Chapter 11 bankruptcy in 1994
1984 establishments in Florida
2017 disestablishments in Florida